The 2004 World Outdoor Bowls Championship  was held at the Northfield Bowls Complex in Ayr, Scotland, from 23 July to 7 August 2004 and Victoria Park, Leamington Spa in England one month later.

Steve Glasson won the men's singles Gold defeating Alex Marshall in the final. Canada claimed the pairs, Scotland took the triples and Ireland won the fours. The Leonard Trophy was won by Scotland for the fifth time extending their impressive record.

Originally the women's championships were going to take place in Kuala Lumpur, Malaysia during 2003 but due to political reasons it was moved to England the following year. Margaret Johnston won her third singles crown setting a new record. New Zealand won the pairs, South Africa the triples and England the fours. The Taylor Trophy was won by England for the fourth time.

Medallists

Results

W.M.Leonard Trophy 

+ Scotland won on points difference +135 to +121

Taylor Trophy

+ Won by virtue of having more shots

References 

 
World Outdoor Bowls Championship
World Outdoor Bowls Championship
2004 in Scottish sport
July 2004 sports events in the United Kingdom
August 2004 sports events in the United Kingdom